Kretzer is a surname. Notable people with the surname include:

 Leonor Kretzer Sullivan (1902–1988), American politician
 Max Kretzer (1854–1941), German writer

See also
 Kretzmer